Mohamed Abdel Fattah (born 17 April 1991), known by his nickname Taha, is an Egyptian footballer who plays as a centre-back for Egyptian Premier League club Haras El Hodoud.

References

1991 births
Living people
Egyptian footballers
Egypt international footballers
Association football defenders
Al Ahly SC players
Pyramids FC players
Footballers from Cairo
Egyptian Premier League players